Carlotta Patti (c. 1840 – 27 June 1889) was a nineteenth-century Italian operatic soprano and older sister to famed soprano Adelina Patti. Various sources list her birth year as 1835, 1840, and 1842. Born Florence, Italy into a musical family, Patti studied the piano in her youth before following her younger sister's inclination toward singing. As a child, Carlotta developed a handicap which caused a noticeable limp in her walk.  Due to this condition she mostly avoided operatic performances and preferred to sing on the concert stage. Carlotta studied voice with Hermine Küchenmeister-Rudersdorf. While not able to achieve her sister's level of acclaim, Carlotta nonetheless received top billing in concerts in the United States of America, Great Britain, and Australia. She was known for her extensive vocal range, reportedly being able to reach a G sharp in altissimo. She often sang songs such as Der Hölle Rache kocht in meinem Herzen that highlighted this extensive range. She made several concert tours with the French baritone Jules Lefort.

Carlotta Patti died of cancer in Paris on 27 June 1889.

References

Year of birth uncertain
1889 deaths
Musicians from Florence
Burials at Montmartre Cemetery
Italian operatic sopranos
Deaths from stomach cancer